An election to Dublin Corporation took place in March 1905 as part of that year's Irish local elections. The election saw a small revival for Labour representatives, whilst the Unionist representation was cut by half.

Council composition following election

References

1905 Irish local elections
1905